The 1887–88 Welsh Cup was the 11th season of the Welsh Cup. The cup was won by Chirk AAA who defeated Newtown 5–0 in the final, at Owens Field, Chester Road, Wrexham.

First round

Second round

Third round

Semi-final

Final

References

Bibliography

Notes 

 The History of the Welsh Cup 1877-1993 by Ian Garland (1991) 
 Welsh Football Data Archive

1887-88
1887–88 domestic association football cups
1887–88 in Welsh football